Üveys Pasha (1512–1547) was an Ottoman governor, and an illegitimate son of Selim I.

Background 
According to the 15th century Ottoman historian Ali Mustafa Efendi, that Selim had a son born from an unnamed concubine during his early years, who was Üveys Pasha, and that his son Suleiman the Magnificent was also aware of this. 

Üveys' mother was a harem girl whose name is not known, but because of her undisciplined manners she was expelled from the harem. In Ottoman tradition, such girls were matched to a bey or to a well-to-do man. However, in her case she was already pregnant and Selim's son was born to a stepfather.

Life 
Selim looked after his son and Üveys soon became a high-ranking bureaucrat of the empire. However, when Selim died in 1520,  Üveys laid no claim to throne because of Ottoman tradition which states that  princes born to a stepfather have no right to ascend to throne. (This principle was similar to Byzantine tradition of Porphyrogenitos)  Suleiman I ascended to throne and he was careful to keep Üveys at the far reaches of his vast empire. In 1535, soon after the capture of Baghdad (now capital of Iraq), Üveys was appointed as the beylerbey of Baghdad. In 1545, he was assigned to capture Ta'izz (a city in Yemen), in which he was successful.

Death 
In 1547, a marine soldier named Pehlivan Hasan started a rebellion in Yemen. While trying to suppress the rebellion, Üveys was killed by the rebels. According to Ali Mustafa Efendi, upon learning the death of his half brother Suleiman wept and said "he was my brother".

References

1512 births
1547 deaths
Pashas
16th-century people from the Ottoman Empire
Civil servants from the Ottoman Empire
Ottoman princes
Illegitimate children of monarchs
Year of birth unknown